Philip Savage (February 1644 – July 1717) was an Anglo-Irish lawyer and politician who was Chancellor of the Exchequer of Ireland.

Savage was born in Dublin, the only son of Valentine Savage and Anne Haughton. He was educated at Trinity College Dublin, entering the university on 6 July 1659. In 1667 he was admitted to King's Inn as an attorney of the exchequer court. In 1671 he became clerk of the Court of King's Bench (Ireland). He left Ireland in 1688 during the War of the Two Kings, but returned in 1691 when, as clerk of the King's Bench, he indicted over 4,000 Irishmen for high treason against William III of England.

Savage represented Wexford County in the Irish House of Commons from 1692 to 1714. Between 1695 and his death he served as Chancellor of the Exchequer of Ireland, aligning himself with the Tory faction. Following the Hanoverian succession, the Whigs attempted to have Savage removed from office and replaced by Sir Ralph Gore, but Savage refused, dying in office.

References

1644 births
1717 deaths
17th-century Anglo-Irish people
18th-century Anglo-Irish people
Alumni of Trinity College Dublin
Chancellors of the Exchequer of Ireland
Irish MPs 1692–1693
Irish MPs 1695–1699
Irish MPs 1703–1713
Irish MPs 1713–1714
Members of the Parliament of Ireland (pre-1801) for County Wexford constituencies
Members of the Privy Council of Ireland
Tory (British political party) politicians